Walter Tjaden (1906–1985) was a German film producer and sound engineer.

Selected filmography

Sound engineer
 Her Majesty Love (1931)
 Hitler Youth Quex (1932)

Producer
 Darling of the Sailors (1937)
 Hotel Sacher (1939)
 A House Full of Love (1954)
 The Unexcused Hour (1957)
 Labyrinth (1959)
 The White Horse Inn (1960)
 The New Adventures of Snow White (1969)
 The Captain (1971)
 Women in Hospital (1977)

References

Bibliography 
 Giesen, Rolf.  Nazi Propaganda Films: A History and Filmography. McFarland, 2003.

External links 
 

1906 births
1985 deaths
People from Oldenburg (city)
German film producers
Film people from Lower Saxony